Bilkis may refer to:
 Bilkis Akhter Jahan Shireen, a Bangladeshi politician
 Bilkis Bano, a victim of the 2002 Gujarat riots
 Bilkis Dadi, an Indian rights activist (birth name: Bilkis Bano)
 Bilkis Islam, a Bangladeshi politician
 Queen of Sheba, also known as Bilkis